Massimo Fink (23 November 1896 – 19 March 1956) was an Italian bobsledder. He competed in the four-man event at the 1924 Winter Olympics.

References

1896 births
1956 deaths
Italian male bobsledders
Olympic bobsledders of Italy
Bobsledders at the 1924 Winter Olympics
Place of birth missing